Krishna Praba is an Indian actress and professional dancer who chiefly appears in Malayalam films. She made her entry into the film industry with the film Madampi (2008), directed by B. Unnikrishnan. She played the character Mollykutty in Life of Josutty (2015), directed by Jeethu Joseph.

Early life
Praba was born to Cr Prabhakaran Nair, a former mechanical engineer at Kalamassery HMT and Sheela Prabhakaran Nair. She completed her primary education from St. Joseph's School, Kalamassery and obtained Higher Secondary Education in humanities from Sacred Heart College, Thevara. Her early influences included Mohiniyattam, Kuchipudi, Nadakam and Margam kali. She received a Diploma certificate in Bharatanatyam from Alliance University Bangalore. Krishna Praba got training in classical dance under the mentorship of Kalamandalam Sugandhi, her first dance teacher, from the age of three.

Career 
Praba received several awards at state level youth festival competition. She joined Manoj Guinness’ Cochin Navodaya troupe as a dancer. She later collaborated with Sajan Palluruthy and Prajodh for Comedy show, a program on Asianet TV channel. After her debut in B Unnikrishnan’s movie, Krishna Praba grew in stature in the Malayalam movie industry by playing different characters in a series of films, most notably in Natholi Oru Cheriya Meenalla (2013) and Life of Josutty (2015). In 2014, she said that she felt privileged to be compared to the late Sukumari after many celebrities including Kavya Madhavan and Ramesh Pisharody pointed out the similarities between the character Krishna played in She Taxi and Sukumari’s character in Boeing Boeing. In 2017, Krishna Praba joined a number of award-winning students to enact Radha Madhavam, a dance drama directed by cine actress Gayathri. She sang song for the movie, Theeram in 2017. She is running Jainika school of arts at Kochi.

Filmography

Films

Television serials

  Other shows
Comedy Show - Asianet, Anchor
Tharotsavam (Reality Show) - Kairali TV, Participant
Shubharathri (Talk show) - Jeevan TV, Anchor
Chill.bowl (cookery show) - Asianet, Anchor
Onaruchi (cookery show) - Kerala Vision, Presenter
 Smart Show (Game Show) -Flowers TV, Participant
 Don't Do Don't Do  (Game Show) - Asianet Plus, ParticipantFast Track - Manorama News, PresenterEnte Thamasha - Janam TV, PresenterLaitham 50 Mazhavil Manorama, DancerThamasha Bazaar (comedy talk show) -Zee Keralam, HoneyOnam Bumper - Zee Keralam, AnchorPCyodoppam Personalayi - Amrita TV, HostImmini Baliya Naavu - Surya TV, PreseneterKomady Circurs - Mazhavil Manoram, Special JudgeFuns Upon a time- Amrita TV, Special JudgeParayam Nedam''- Amrita TV, Participant

References

External links
 
 

Kerala State Film Award winners
Living people
Indian film actresses
Actresses in Malayalam cinema
Year of birth missing (living people)
Actresses from Kochi
Indian television actresses
Actresses in Malayalam television
Indian female classical dancers
Performers of Indian classical dance
Dancers from Kerala
21st-century Indian actresses